Dr. Yaw Osei Adutwum is a Ghanaian politician and member of the Seventh Parliament of the Fourth Republic of Ghana representing the Bosomtwe Constituency in the Ashanti Region on the ticket of the New Patriotic Party. He is noted for his unannounced teaching visits to schools although he is not in active teaching service. On 5 March 2021, He was appointed by Nana Akufo-Addo as the Minister of Education.

Early life and education 
He hails from Jachie in the Ashanti region of Ghana. Dr. Yaw Osei Adutwum obtained a bachelor's degree in Land Economy (Business Administration with a major in Real Estate) from the Kwame Nkrumah University of Science and Technology prior to he migrating to the USA and also holds a master's degree in Education Management from the University of La Verne and a PhD in Educational Policy, Planning and Administration from the University of Southern California. He is also an old student of Kumasi High School in Ashanti Region-Ghana, where he had his Advanced level education certificate.

Career 
He founded the New Designs Charter Schools but prior to that, he worked as a Mathematics and Information Technology teacher at the Manual Arts High School for ten years and within this period, he founded the International Studies Academy which served as a small learning community for students to thrive academically and socially. He also served as the lead Maths teach in the USC/ Manual Arts Neighborhood Academic Initiative (NAI). He was also part of the task force established by the National Research for Career and Technical to develop a national model for career and technical education in High School and College levels.

Politics 
He is the MP for Bosomtwe Constituency in the Ashanti region of Ghana. In the 2016 elections, He obtained 46,238 votes out of the total 54,144 votes cast representing 85.82% whilst his closest contender the then District Chief Executive (DCE) of the Bosomtwe District Veronica Antwi-Adjei of the National Democratic Congress (NDC) had 7,215 votes representing 13.39%.

Committees 
He is part of the Works and Housing Committee and also the Poverty Reduction Strategy Committee in the 7th Parliament of the 4th Republic of Ghana.

In March 2017, Adutwum was appointed by President Nana Akufo-Addo to serve as Deputy Minister for education. He is currently serving as the Deputy Minister for Education in charge of Pre-tertiary Education. In 2019 he was voted the Best Performing Deputy Minister of the Year by two research bodies: Alliance for Social Equity and Public Accountability (ASEPA) and FAKS Investigative Services.

Personal life 
He is married with a child. He is a Christian and worships at the Pentecost Church.

References

Ghanaian MPs 2017–2021
1964 births
Living people
New Patriotic Party politicians
Kumasi High School alumni
Kwame Nkrumah University of Science and Technology alumni
University of Southern California alumni
University of La Verne alumni
Ghanaian Pentecostals
Ghanaian MPs 2021–2025